Dame June Rosemary Whitfield  (11 November 1925 – 29 December 2018) was an English radio, television, and film actress.

Her big break was a lead in the radio comedy Take It from Here, which aired on the BBC Light Programme in 1953. Television roles soon followed, including appearances with Tony Hancock throughout his television career. In 1966, Whitfield played the leading role in the television sitcom Beggar My Neighbour, which ran for three series. She also appeared in four Carry On films: Carry On Nurse (1959), Carry On Abroad (1972), Carry On Girls (1973), and Carry On Columbus (1992).

In 1968, Whitfield and Terry Scott began a long television partnership, which peaked with roles as husband and wife in Happy Ever After (1974–1979) and Terry and June (1979–1987). From 1992 to 2012, Whitfield played Edina Monsoon's mother in Jennifer Saunders' Absolutely Fabulous. She played a regular character in Last of the Summer Wine (2005–2010) and a recurring character in The Green Green Grass (2007–2009). She also featured in The Dick Emery Show as the housewife of a house burglar and other roles in the 70’s.

From 1993 to 2001, Whitfield played Miss Marple in the radio dramatisation of all twelve of Agatha Christie's Miss Marple novels on BBC Radio 4.

Early life
June Rosemary Whitfield was born at 44 Mount Ephraim Lane in Streatham, London, in 1925, to John Herbert Whitfield and his wife Bertha Georgina née Flett. Her father was the managing director of a company called Dictograph Telephones that had been founded by his father in Yorkshire, and both of her parents were keen amateur actors. She made her first stage appearance, aged three, after her mother enrolled her at Robinson's Dance Studio. Whitfield attended Streatham Hill High School, before being evacuated during the Second World War to Bognor Regis, where she attended St Michael's School, and then to Penzance in Cornwall. She moved with her parents to Huddersfield, where she learned shorthand and typing. She continued to study secretarial skills at Pitman's College, Brixton Hill. In 1944, Whitfield graduated from the Royal Academy of Dramatic Art with a diploma.

Career

Early career 
Whitfield began her career in the 1940s working with Wilfred Pickles, and worked on stage in the West End and the regions.

In 1951, she had her first credited television role in The Passing Show and joined the London cast of the musical South Pacific.

Her big break came in 1953 when she replaced Joy Nichols in the successful Frank Muir and Denis Norden radio comedy Take It from Here, co-starring Jimmy Edwards and Dick Bentley. In the portion of the show known as "The Glums" she played Eth, fiancée of the dim Ron Glum (played by Bentley). During the next fifteen years Whitfield had many supporting roles on television, including in Dixon of Dock Green, Arthur's Treasured Volumes, The Arthur Askey Show, Faces of Jim, The Benny Hill Show, Steptoe and Son and Frankie Howerd. She played the nurse in the opening scene of "The Blood Donor" (Hancock, 1961). June's daughter Suzy Aitchison would play the same role in the 2009 re-recording  with Paul Merton portraying Tony Hancock.

In 1959, she appeared in Carry On Nurse, the first of her four appearances in the Carry On film series.

1960s to 1980s 
Whitfield gained her first starring role in the sitcom Beggar My Neighbour (1966), playing Rose Garvey. The year after Beggar My Neighbour finished in 1968, she appeared on Scott On... for six years until 1974. This started a working relationship with Terry Scott that lasted until 1987. During Scott On... she also appeared in The Best Things in Life, The Goodies, The Dick Emery Show, Bless This House and The Pallisers. She appeared in the spin-off film of Bless This House (1972), with Scott as her husband, and Carry On Abroad (also 1972), followed by an appearance in Carry On Girls (1973).

Whitfield starred alongside Scott in a Comedy Playhouse sitcom pilot called Happy Ever After (1974). A few months later the first full series was broadcast, with a further four series until 1979. Later that year, they appeared together in the first series of Terry and June. The two sitcoms were very similar, the only main differences being a change of surname (from Fletcher to Medford), and a different house and family. Both had Scott and Whitfield as a suburban middle-class married couple. Terry and June ran for 65 episodes until 1987. Five years later, in 1992, Julian Clary created Terry and Julian, a Channel 4 sitcom which spoofed the title of Terry and June; Whitfield made an appearance in one episode. During the eight-year run of Terry and June, Whitfield also appeared in It Ain't Half Hot Mum and Minder.

In the 1970s and early 1980s, Whitfield appeared in a series of television advertisements, created for Birds Eye by advertising art director Vernon Howe, and featuring the concluding voice-over line: "it can make a dishonest woman of you!"

In 1971, Whitfield and Frankie Howerd recorded a novelty comic version of the song "Je t'aime", previously recorded by Jane Birkin and Serge Gainsbourg, in which she featured as "Mavis".

She was the subject of This Is Your Life on two occasions: in April 1976, when she was surprised by Eamonn Andrews at her home in Wimbledon; and in March 1995, when Michael Aspel surprised her at BBC Television Centre.

During the 1980s, Whitfield returned to radio comedy. From 1984, she could be heard with Roy Hudd on the satire programme The News Huddlines, which finished in 2001. On it she often used impersonations and was known for her impression of the then Prime Minister Margaret Thatcher. During the 1980s and 1990s, she made several stage appearances, including in a revival of An Ideal Husband and the pantomime Babes in the Wood. In 1985, she sang a duet with Ian Charleson of the Irving Berlin song "You're Just in Love" in A Royal Night of One Hundred Stars.

1990s to 2010s 
Having appeared in an episode of French and Saunders in 1988, Whitfield played Mother in Jennifer Saunders' sitcom Absolutely Fabulous from 1992 until 2012. In 2000, she featured with the rest of the Absolutely Fabulous cast in the pilot Mirrorball. From 1993 to 2001, she played Miss Marple in 12 radio adaptations of Agatha Christie's Miss Marple books. From 1990, she appeared in films including Carry On Columbus (1992), Jude (1996) and Faeries (1999, as the voice of Mrs Coombs). In 1998, Whitfield played the housekeeper in the London-set episode of Friends "The One with Ross's Wedding, Part Two" and voiced a character in an episode of the animated comedy series Rex the Runt.

Her autobiography And June Whitfield, written with the help of Christopher Douglas, appeared in 2000. She appeared in The Royal, followed by appearances in Midsomer Murders, Agatha Christie's Marple, New Tricks and Last of the Summer Wine, which she joined in 2005. She had an episode of The South Bank Show devoted to her on 29 July 2007 and, in the same year, appeared in the English National Opera's production of On the Town in London's West End. In November 2007, she appeared in the Only Fools and Horses spin-off The Green Green Grass as the mother of Marlene, and in 2008 she appeared in an episode of ITV medical drama Harley Street. In 2009, she made a guest appearance in Kingdom and published an updated autobiography, At a Glance ... An Absolutely Fabulous Life, a collection of scrapbook pictures from her life and career.

Whitfield appeared in the Doctor Who two-part episode, "The End of Time", that aired over Christmas 2009New Year 2010. On 29 December 2009, she was the subject of an entire evening's tribute programming on BBC Two.

In 2010, Whitfield was signed for a short appearance on ITV soap opera Coronation Street. Her character, May, appeared at the funeral of Blanche Hunt and explained to Blanche's daughter, Deirdre, how her mother had died. In 2011, she played Margaret Rutherford in the BBC Radio 4 play A Monstrous Vitality, a radio adaption by Andy Merriman of his biography of Rutherford, A Dreadnought with Good Manners. She reprised her role of Mother in two episodes of Absolutely Fabulous at Christmas 2011New Year 2012, and for an Olympic special on 23 July 2012. In 2013, Whitfield became the inaugural recipient of the Aardman Slapstick Comedy Legend Award, a recognition of her lifetime's contribution to the world of comedy. In 2014, she made a second appearance in Midsomer Murders, and appeared in Jonathan Creek and Boomers. In 2015, she played Granny Wallon in a BBC One adaptation of Laurie Lee's classic novel Cider with Rosie.

In May 2015, Whitfield made a guest appearance in the BBC soap EastEnders as a nun called Sister Ruth and returned to the show in January 2016 to complete a storyline. In October 2015, it was confirmed that she would reprise her role of Mother in Absolutely Fabulous: The Movie which was released in July 2016. She made a guest appearance as God in the Sky 1 series You, Me and the Apocalypse, which was broadcast in November 2015.

Honours and awards
In 1982, Whitfield was made a Freeman of the City of London.

Whitfield was appointed Officer of the Order of the British Empire (OBE) in the 1985 Birthday Honours, Commander of the Order of the British Empire (CBE) in the 1998 Birthday Honours, and Dame Commander of the Order of the British Empire (DBE) in the 2017 Birthday Honours for services to drama and entertainment.

In 1994, Whitfield was given a Lifetime Achievement Award by the British Comedy Awards.

Personal life and death
In 1955, she married Timothy John Aitchison, who was working as a surveyor. The couple had a daughter, Suzy Aitchison, who became an actress. Timothy Aitchison died in 2001.

Despite her success, Whitfield never wanted a lead role, stating that she lacked the drive and confidence. She attributed the premature deaths of several comedians to "the responsibility, the stress and strain" of carrying their shows. In her autobiography, she described her own life as "full of love, affection and laughter, of gigs, gags and a couple of gongs".

In December 2017, Whitfield said that she was living in a care home. She died in London on 29 December 2018, aged 93. Her funeral was held at All Hallows Church in Tillington, near Petworth in West Sussex, on 18 January 2019, attended by many of her co-stars and personal friends.

Fellow Absolutely Fabulous actress Jennifer Saunders paid tribute to the "extraordinary grace" of Whitfield and said she would "hugely" miss her "dear friend". Julia Sawalha described her as a "great source of inspiration". Actress Jane Horrocks said her former co-star was a "wonderful lady", who was "versatile, funny and generous".

Radio

Miss Marple 

Whitfield played Miss Marple in 12 BBC Radio 4 adaptations of novels by Agatha Christie. She reprised the role in 2015, starring in three adaptations of Miss Marple short stories (Tape-Measure Murder, The Case of the Perfect Maid, and Sanctuary).

Other 
Bring on the Girls (1955)
Starstruck (1955)
Take It from Here (1955)
Midweek Theatre (1967)
Happy Ever After (1976)
It Doesn't Have to Hurt! (1990)
Like They've Never Been Gone (2001)
The Afternoon Play: Seven Floors (2003)

Filmography

Film

Television

Books
 – (autobiography, with Christopher Douglas)

Notes

References

External links
 
 

1925 births
2018 deaths
Actresses awarded damehoods
Actresses from London
Alumni of RADA
British comedy actresses
Dames Commander of the Order of the British Empire
English film actresses
English radio actresses
English stage actresses
English television actresses
English voice actresses
People educated at Streatham and Clapham High School
People from Streatham
20th-century English actresses
21st-century English actresses
Audiobook narrators